Pleistodontes rigisamos is a species of fig wasp which is native to Australia.  It has an obligate mutualism with Ficus destruens, the fig species it pollinates.

References 

Agaonidae
Hymenoptera of Australia
Insects described in 1991